The  was an army of the Imperial Japanese Army during World War II.

History
The Japanese Mongolia Garrison Army was raised on December 27, 1937 as a garrison force in Japanese-dominated Inner Mongolia and adjacent areas of north China. From July 4, 1938, the Mongolia Garrison Army came under the administrative jurisdiction of the North China Area Army. In January 1939 the Cavalry Group was added, consisting of the 1st Cavalry Brigade and 4th Cavalry Brigade. In December 1942, the 4th Cavalry Brigade was sent to the Twelfth Army and the remainder of the Cavalry Group was converted into the 3rd Tank Division.

During most of the Second Sino-Japanese War and due to the Soviet–Japanese Neutrality Pact, Inner Mongolia was largely a backwater region, and the Mongolia Garrison Army, with its antiquated horse cavalry functioned largely to assist and train the Mengjiang National Army and Mongolian Cavalry Corps. It was thus unprepared for the massive Soviet Red Army armored assault at the end of World War II. The Mongolia Garrison Army was officially disbanded on July 27, 1946. Many of its survivors became Japanese prisoners of war in the Soviet Union.

List of commanders

Commanding Officer

Chief of Staff

See also
List of Armies of the Japanese Army

References

External links

Japanese armies
History of Inner Mongolia
1930s in China
1940s in China
Military units and formations established in 1937
Military units and formations disestablished in 1946
1937 establishments in Japan
1946 disestablishments in Japan
20th-century disestablishments in Mongolia